{{DISPLAYTITLE:Gδ space}}
In mathematics, particularly topology, a Gδ space is a topological space in which closed sets are in a way ‘separated’ from their complements using only countably many open sets. A Gδ space may thus be regarded as a space satisfying a different kind of separation axiom. In fact normal Gδ spaces are referred to as perfectly normal spaces, and satisfy the strongest of separation axioms.

Gδ spaces are also called perfect spaces. The term perfect is also used, incompatibly, to refer to a space with no isolated points; see Perfect set.

Definition
A countable intersection of open sets in a topological space is called a Gδ set.  Trivially, every open set is a Gδ set.  Dually, a countable union of closed sets is called an Fσ set.  Trivially, every closed set is an Fσ set.

A topological space X is called a Gδ space if every closed subset of X is a Gδ set. Dually and equivalently, a Gδ space is a space in which every open set is an Fσ set.

Properties and examples
 Every subspace of a Gδ space is a Gδ space.
 Every metrizable space is a Gδ space. The same holds for pseudometrizable spaces.
 Every second countable regular space is a Gδ space.  This follows from the Urysohn's metrization theorem in the Hausdorff case, but can easily be shown directly.
 Every countable regular space is a Gδ space.
 Every hereditarily Lindelöf regular space is a Gδ space.  Such spaces are in fact perfectly normal.  This generalizes the previous two items about second countable and countable regular spaces.
 A Gδ space need not be normal, as R endowed with the K-topology shows.  That example is not a regular space.  Examples of Tychonoff Gδ spaces that are not normal are the Sorgenfrey plane and the Niemytzki plane.
 In a first countable T1 space, every singleton is a Gδ  set.  That is not enough for the space to be a Gδ space, as shown for example by the lexicographic order topology on the unit square.
 The Sorgenfrey line is an example of a perfectly normal (i.e. normal Gδ) space that is not metrizable.
 The topological sum  of a family of disjoint topological spaces is a Gδ space if and only if each  is a Gδ space.

Notes

References
 
 
 Roy A. Johnson (1970). "A Compact Non-Metrizable Space Such That Every Closed Subset is a G-Delta". The American Mathematical Monthly, Vol. 77, No. 2, pp. 172–176. on JStor

General topology
Real analysis